Circa is a word of Latin origin meaning 'approximately'.

Circa or CIRCA may also refer to:
 CIRCA (art platform), art platform based in London
 Circa (band), a progressive rock supergroup
 Circa (company), an American skateboard footwear company
 Circa (contemporary circus), an Australian contemporary circus company
 Circa District, Abancay Province, Peru
 Circa, a disc-binding notebook system 
 Circa Theatre, in Wellington, New Zealand
 Clandestine Insurgent Rebel Clown Army, a UK activist group
 Circa News, an online news and entertainment service
 Circa Complex, twin skyscrapers in Los Angeles, California
 Circa (album), an album by Michael Cain
 Circa Resort & Casino, a hotel in downtown Las Vegas